Veligandla is a village in Prakasam district of the Indian state of Andhra Pradesh. It is located in Veligandla mandal in Kandukur revenue division.

References

Villages in Prakasam district
Mandal headquarters in Prakasam district